The Seumas McNally Grand Prize is the main award given at the Independent Games Festival (IGF), an annual event that takes place during the Game Developers Conference, one of the largest gatherings of the indie video game industry. The award is named after computer game programmer Seumas McNally (1979–2000), founder of independent game development company Longbow Digital Arts. McNally died of Hodgkin's lymphoma shortly after receiving the award, then just the IGF Grand Prize, in 2000 for his game Tread Marks. The award is given alongside a prize of US$30,000.

Twenty-six video games have received the award, and more than 50 have been selected as finalists. Fire and Darkness became the first recipient of the award in the 1999 edition of the Independent Games Festival. The award was split into two for the 2004 and 2005 Independent Games Festival events, but was merged back into a single prize in 2006. From 2011 onwards, a list of "Honorable Mentions", composed of games that were not finalists, was introduced.

Gish and Seed are the only games to become finalists in multiple editions of the event. Additionally, Gish is the only finalist to win the prize in a subsequent edition of the festival. FTL: Faster Than Light was the first game to have been both an honorable mention and a finalist, achieving the former in 2012 and the latter in 2013. The Stanley Parable achieved the same feat, becoming an honorable mention in 2013 and a finalist in 2014. Games do not have to be published in order to qualify for the prize; when Fez won the award in 2012, it was still undergoing pre-release certification. Some developers have won the prize twice, either solo or as part of a larger team: Alec Holowka for Aquaria and Night in the Woods, and Lucas Pope for Papers, Please and Return of the Obra Dinn.

Recipients

Notes

References 

Specific

Indie video games
 
Independent Games Festival Awards
Awards for best video game